German XXIII. Corps (XXIII. Armeekorps) was a corps in the German Army during World War II.

Commanders

 Infantry General (General der Infanterie) Erich Raschick, April 1939 – 26 October 1939
 Infantry General (General der Infanterie) Albrecht Schubert, 26 October 1939 – 25 July 1942
 Infantry General (General der Infanterie) Carl Hilpert, 25 July 1942 – 19 January 1943
 Colonel-General (Generaloberst) Johannes Frießner, 19 January 1943 – 7 December 1943
 Panzer General (General der Panzertruppe) Hans Freiherr von Funck, 7 December 1943 – 2 February 1944
 Pioneer General (General der Pioniere) Otto Tiemann, 2 February 1944 – 12 October 1944
 Infantry General (General der Infanterie) Walter Melzer, 12 October 1944 – 8 May 1945

Area of operations
 West Wall – September 1939 – June 1941
 Eastern Front, central sector – June 1941 – May 1945

See also
 List of German corps in World War II

External links

Army,23
Military units and formations established in 1939
1939 establishments in Germany
Military units and formations disestablished in 1945